Hayden Thompson (born March 5, 1938) is an American singer, songwriter, and rockabilly musician. He is a member of the Rockabilly Hall of Fame.

Thompson was born in Booneville, Mississippi, United States. At high school Thompson formed the Southern Melody Boys, who made a recording which led from a radio session. "I Feel the Blues Coming On" was sung by Thompson and gave them another radio appearance on the "Louisiana Hayride" show. Thompson then joined the Dixie Jazzlanders who toured Mississippi.  He relocated to Memphis, Tennessee and made an unreleased recording in 1956.  "Love My Baby" was issued on the Phillips International label in September 1957, and Thompson toured alongside Sonny Burgess and Billy Lee Riley.  The following year, Thompson moved again, this time to Chicago, Illinois, where he gained a residency at the Rivoli Ballroom, Chicago's latest country music venue.

Thompson's recording of "$16.88" for Kapp Records sold sufficiently to secure him an offer to record his debut album.  Here's Hayden Thompson was released in 1967.  Several recordings took place in the early-1970s, but circumstances meant that Thompson left the music industry at this point and worked as a limo driver.  He re-emerged in the mid-1980s, becoming a regular performer on rockabilly revival touring packages.  Charley Records released an album of his in 1985.  Further albums were released, mainly by various European record labels, over the three decades. These included The Time Is Now (1990).

Albums

Compilations
 Love My Baby (1999) (Collection of earlier work)

References

1938 births
Living people
American male singer-songwriters
American rockabilly musicians
Sun Records artists
Phillips International Records artists
Charly Records artists
Kapp Records artists
People from Booneville, Mississippi
20th-century American singers
21st-century American singers
20th-century American guitarists
21st-century American guitarists
American rock singers
American country singer-songwriters
Singer-songwriters from Mississippi
Guitarists from Mississippi
American male guitarists
Country musicians from Mississippi
20th-century American male singers
21st-century American male singers